Neny Matterhorn is a sharp, pyramid-shaped peak over 1,125 m, standing in the northwest part of the Blackwall Mountains on the south side of Neny Fjord, Graham Land. First roughly surveyed in 1936-37 by the British Graham Land Expedition (BGLE) under Rymill, and resurveyed in 1948-49 by the Falkland Islands Dependencies Survey (FIDS). The name was apparently first used by members of the Ronne Antarctic Research Expedition (RARE), 1947–48, under Ronne, and the FIDS, and derives from its location near Neny Fjord, and its resemblance to the Matterhorn.

Mountains of Graham Land
Fallières Coast